Closer to the Flame is the second studio album of Joel Kroeker and the third of his albums after his 1999 independent release CD Naive Bohemian and 2004 release of Melodrama.

The album released in 2007 on True North Records and was produced by Danny Greenspoon. It was registered at the "Canterbury Sound" in Toronto, Ontario in Canada.

Track listing
 "Against Myself"    
 "King of Hearts"    
 "Closer to the Flame"    
 "Good Stuff"    
 "Sacred Heart"    
 "Remember the Song"    
 "Hymn Number One"    
 "You Feel It"    
 "At the Drive In"    
 "Guide Us Home"    
 "Nothing But the Stars"    
 "These Quiet Streets"    
 "Déjà Vu" (Bonus track) (with Dany Bédar)

Singles from the Album
 "Déjà Vu" (as a Joel Kroeker / Dany Bédar duo)
 "Against Myself"

2007 albums
Joel Kroeker albums
True North Records albums